The Bank of the State of Georgia was organized in Atlanta on April 1, 1873.
The founders were Francis M. Coker (who served as president), Lemuel P. Grant, developer Thomas G. Healey, and future mayor Robert F. Maddox.
The bank was liquidated in May 1917.

History of Atlanta
Defunct banks of the United States
Banks established in 1873
Banks disestablished in 1917